Bertrand III of Baux (also known as Bertrando Del Balzo), Count of Andria, Montescaglioso, and Squillace, Lord of Berre, Senator of Rome, Captain-General of Tuscany, and Justiciar of Naples, was born in August 1295 at Andria, Italy to Bertrand II of Baux and Berengaria of Andria. He married, as his first wife, Beatrice of Anjou, daughter of King Charles II of Naples, in 1309; she died c. 1321.
His daughter was:
 Marie, who married Humbert II of Viennois

He married a second time to Marguerite d'Aulnay in about 1324.
Their son was:
 Francis of Baux, Duke of Andria, Count of Montescaglioso and Squillace, and Lord of Berre, Mison, and Tiano. He had three wives: Luisa de San Severino, Margaret of Taranto and Sueva Orsini.

He died on 15 September 1347 in Naples, Italy and was buried at San Domenico Maggiore.

References

Sources

1295 births
1347 deaths
House of Baux
Italian people of French descent